Hd 4000 may refer to:

 Radeon HD 4000 series
 Intel HD Graphics 4000